Trifun Kostovski (born 27 December 1946 in Skopje) is a Macedonian politician, businessman and singer, and the ex-Mayor of Skopje.

He is married and he has three children. He graduated from the Faculty of Economics at the Ss. Cyril and Methodius University in Skopje. He is fluent in English, Polish, Russian and Croatian.

Career history 

Founder of Kometal Trade Gmbh, Vienna, Austria (1991). The Company deals with activities in the field of metallurgy on the Austrian, Swiss, Polish, Ukrainian and Russian markets.

Prior experience

First employment in Tehnometal-Macedonia, Skopje (1971)
Representative of Tehnometal-Macedonia in Warsaw office
Employment in Swiss company Sitko, Vienna (1989)
Representative of Sitko in Warsaw office

Key achievements and awards

“Clement of Ohrid” Award for achievements in the sphere of science, arts, culture and humanitarian work (2004)
Founder of "Trifun Kostovski" Fund within the Macedonian Academy of Sciences and Arts. The Fund sponsors editions, publications, scientific projects, and collections of fine arts of national importance
Ktitor of the building of the cathedral church “Holly Mother of God”, protector of Skopje
President and sponsor of the football club FK Vardar
Founder and financier of several media houses in North Macedonia
Financing and supporting great number of NGOs, hospitals and social institutions, humanitarian and voluntary activities, aids to disabled, financial support for the poor people, donations for operations and treatment of sick people
Sponsorship for education of young musicians and artists
Sponsorship for preservation and restoration of cultural and historical monuments
Sponsorship for the sacred places of the Macedonian Orthodox Church
Donations for important activities and buildings in Skopje (street “Vodnjanska”, quay “November 13th”, boulevard “Marx and Engels”, monument of Mother Teresa, infrastructure in several schools, gymnasiums, faculties and villages) and in other cities in the country.

Political involvement

Member of Parliament, in capacity of an independent member from 2002 to 2005
International Crisis Group (ICG) Board Member
US Council on Foreign Relations Corporate Member
Global Business Coalition on HIV/AIDS Corporate Member
Member of the Business Advisory Council, Working Table II of the Stability Pact for South Eastern Europe
Member of the Parliamentary Assembly of CEI
Founder and member of Forum for Macedonia 2001
Founder and member of Forum for Euro-Atlantic Integration of Republic of Macedonia (FEIM)
 Ex-President of the Macedonian Handball Federation
Mayor of Skopje from 2005–2009

Sports involvement
 Former owner of the football club FK Rabotnički 
 Former owner of the football club FK Vardar 
 Former owner of the women's handball club RK Kometal Gjorče Petrov
 Former owner of the football club FK Borec

References 

1946 births
Living people
FK Rabotnički
FK Vardar
FK Borec
Mayors of Skopje
Ss. Cyril and Methodius University of Skopje alumni